Asbjørn Aavik (November 30, 1902 – November 20, 1997) was a Norwegian Lutheran missionary to China. He was also the author of approximately forty books.

Early years
Aavik was born in Aavig (now Åvik) in  Lindesnes, Norway.  From 1921 to 1926, he received education at Fjellhaug utdanningssenter in Oslo, a missionary school affiliated with the Norwegian Lutheran Mission.

Missionary work 
He was sent to China in 1928 where he started on the China Mission Association's mission fields around Laohekou in Hubei. Aavik married Ragna Torgersen (1906–1984) in 1932 and later moved to the Yunyang northwestern mission area. The situation was turbulent, not least because of robber bands and the communist insurgency in the 1930s. In 1935 the couple decided to return to Norway.

The planned return trip to China had to be postponed because the missionaries in China warned of increasing uncertainty and unease, but in 1938 Aavik traveled alone, without family, back to the same mission field in China. The Norwegian missionaries would later temporarily and definitely leave this field because of World War II and the subsequent communist advance. Aavik returned home for the second time in 1946.

Aavik still came back to the Republic of China, now Taiwan, where he worked with less interruption from 1952 to 1970. His work consisted partly in teaching at a Bible school at Kaohsiung and at the Lutheran Theological Seminary in Taipei and Taichung. He also became the first principal at the China Lutheran Seminary in Hsinchu.

He was the writer of many missionary books. In the summer of 1999, a memorial stone was unveiled for the missionary in Åvik.

Selected works

Best known
Temple of the Spirit'''', 1953 (translated to Chinese)Holy unrest, 1956

NovelsThey are waiting, 1940 (published in four editions)Nybrott, 1941Dalen, 1949 (best novel winner)The white river, 1951The Red Lotus, 1957The earth is bleeding, 1964

AutobiographicalRoses in the rain: Young year in China, 1977Aavik in maturation: Rich years in ChinaGrotid in the storm: War years in China, 1982

OtherAt the border, 1948The struggle for borders. Tanganyika and Christian Mission, 1952The shade of the bamboo carpet, 1955At the Kingdom Gate, 1959The East Comes, 1962God of Jacob, 1965The Missionary Association in Asia, 1966The Kingdom Comes, 1967Everyday, 1968The Sand by the Sea, 1968Elisa – Safat's son, 1969The sand was white, 1970Window to Hong Kong, 1971Golden Sand, 1973Window to Japan, 1973Wrecked silver: King Saul, 1975The China I saw again, 1980Years in the sun, Breakthrough in Taiwan, 1984Hiking, 1987 (devotional)

Articles
 Harald Stene Dehlin and Asbjørn Aavik:The priest with the red ads, Luther, 1979 (if Olaf Stromme) 
 "The mission of a track change" I:Norwegian Journal of mission, Årg. 6, No. 2 (1952)
 "A Christian statesman and the world" I:Norwegian Journal of mission, Årg. 17, No. 2 (1963) (If Chiang Kai-Chek)

See also

 Marie Monsen

References

Related literature 
 Gunnar Bråthen:Spirit and mission: the revival of Samba Its mission field in China, 1930–1932, with particular emphasis on how Marie Monsen and Asbjørn Aavik experienced this. Unpublished student assignment, MF, 2001
 Asbjørn Nordgård:The wizards: they taught me something for life and eternity.'' Lunde, 2005

External links 
 Biography from Fjellhaug school
 

1902 births
1997 deaths
People from Lindesnes
Lutheran missionaries in China
Norwegian writers
20th-century Norwegian writers
Norwegian Lutheran missionaries
Norwegian expatriates in China
20th-century Lutherans